CIGO-FM is a Canadian radio station, broadcasting in Port Hawkesbury, Nova Scotia at 101.5 FM. The station plays an adult contemporary format branded as "101.5 The Hawk".

CIGO started as an AM station at 1410 kHz. Founded by Gerald Doucet, it first went on the air on October 29, 1975. In November 1999, CIGO received CRTC approval to convert to FM. In 2000, CIGO switched over to FM and the AM signal was shut down permanently shortly afterwards. As an AM station, it was known as 1410 CIGO.

The station's primary coverage area is Inverness, Richmond, Antigonish and Guysborough counties, but it can be heard beyond that area.

On June 8, 2010, MacEachern Broadcasting Limited (CIGO-FM) applied to increase their ERP (effective radiated power) from 19,000 to 40,000 watts and received CRTC approval on September 17, 2010.

CIGO is owned and operated by Acadia Broadcasting.

References

External links
101.5 The Hawk

Acadia Broadcasting radio stations
Igo
Igo
Radio stations established in 1975
1975 establishments in Nova Scotia